Olavina Udugore is a 1987 Indian Kannada-language film directed, written and co-produced by D. Rajendra Babu. The film stars Ambareesh, Manjula Sharma and Ramakrishna. The music was composed by M. Ranga Rao and the script was written by B. L. Venu.

Cast
 Ambareesh as Suresh
Ilavarasi(Manjula Sharma) as Suma and Uma (Dual Role)
 Leelavathi as Rathnamma, Suresh's Mother
 Ramakrishna as Ramesh, Suresh's Cousin
 Keerthiraj as Prathap
 Balakrishna as Raganna
 Dinesh as Shridhara Raya, Suma's Adoptive Father
 N. S. Rao as Baalu, Suresh's Classmate
 Umashree as Baby, Suresh's Classmate
 Shanthamma

Soundtrack

All songs were composed by M. Ranga Rao, with lyrics by R. N. Jayagopal and Shyamasundara Kulkarni. The album consists of five tracks. The title song will recreated for his son's debut film Amar
 Empty

Awards
 Filmfare Award for Best Actor - Kannada - Ambareesh

References

External links 
 

1987 films
1980s Kannada-language films
Indian romance films
Films scored by M. Ranga Rao
1980s romance films
Films directed by D. Rajendra Babu